Lecithocera caveiformis is a moth in the family Lecithoceridae. It was described by Edward Meyrick in 1931. It is found in Mumbai, India.

References

Moths described in 1931
Taxa named by Edward Meyrick
caveiformis